Opa Sanganté (born 1 February 1991) is a professional footballer who plays as a midfielder for Championnat National club Châteauroux. Born in Senegal, Sanganté plays for the Guinea-Bissau national team.

Club career
Sanganté moved to France from Senegal at the age of 6, and played football since he was a child. He made his professional debut for LB Châteauroux in a 3–2 Ligue 2 win over Stade Brestois 29 on 28 July 2017.

International career
Born in Senegal, Sanganté is of Bissau-Guinean descent, and was called up to represent the Guinea-Bissau in October 2020. He debuted for Guinea-Bissau in a 2–0 2021 Africa Cup of Nations qualification loss to Senegal on 13 November 2020.

References

External links

 
 
 

1991 births
Living people
People from Casamance
Association football midfielders
Citizens of Guinea-Bissau through descent
Bissau-Guinean footballers
Guinea-Bissau international footballers
Senegalese footballers
Senegalese people of Bissau-Guinean descent
AS Beauvais Oise players
LB Châteauroux players
Ligue 2 players
Championnat National 3 players
Championnat National 2 players
Championnat National players
Senegalese expatriate footballers
Expatriate footballers in France
Senegalese expatriate sportspeople in France
2021 Africa Cup of Nations players